The 2019 Duke Blue Devils women's soccer team represented Duke University during the 2019 NCAA Division I women's soccer season.  The Blue Devils were led by head coach Robbie Church, in his nineteenth season.  They played home games at Koskinen Stadium.  This was the team's 32nd season playing organized women's college soccer and their 32nd playing in the Atlantic Coast Conference.

The Blue Devils finished the season 9–4–7, 3–1–6 in ACC play to finish in sixth place.  As the sixth seed in the ACC Tournament, lost to Virginia in the Quarterfinals.  They received an at-large bid to the NCAA Tournament where they defeated Utah before losing to Wisconsin in the Second Round.

Squad

Roster

Updated July 6, 2020

Team management

Source:

Schedule 
Source:

|-
!colspan=8 style=""| Exhibition

|-
!colspan=7 style=""| Non-Conference Regular season

|-
!colspan=7 style=""| ACC Regular season

|-
!colspan=8 style=""| ACC Tournament

|-
!colspan=8 style=""| NCAA Tournament

2020 NWSL College Draft

Source:

Rankings

References

Duke
Duke Blue Devils women's soccer seasons
2019 in sports in North Carolina